Franco Pian (16 February 1922 – 18 January 2019) was an Italian professional football player. Pian died in January 2019 at the age of 96.

References

1922 births
2019 deaths
A.C. Legnano players
Inter Milan players
Italian footballers
Serie A players
S.P.A.L. players
Association football defenders
A.S.D. La Biellese players